Aenetus montanus is a moth of the family Hepialidae. It is known from the Australian Capital Territory and New South Wales.

The larvae feed on Eucalyptus pauciflora, subspecies pauciflora and niphophila. They bore in trees and saplings.

References

Moths described in 1953
Hepialidae